Novokemsky is a rural locality (a settlement) in Konevskoye Rural Settlement, Vashkinsky District, Vologda Oblast, Russia. The population was 1,044 as of 2002. There are 18 streets.

Geography 
Novokemsky is located on the bank of the Kema River, 58 km northwest of Lipin Bor (the district's administrative centre) by road. Domantovo is the nearest rural locality.

References 

Rural localities in Vashkinsky District